Surf Life Saving Clubs (or SLSCs) are volunteer institutions at Australia's beaches. The clubs conduct surf lifesaving services on weekends and public holidays, and in the 2014-2015 season they saved 12,690 people. They also host many beach sport activities, such as Nippers, surf carnivals and other competitions. The SLSCs are responsible for the education of Lifesavers including operation of Inflatable Rescue Boats (IRBs) and maintaining radio communication with other beaches and air rescue resources.

See also
Surf Life Saving Australia
List of Australian surf lifesaving clubs
Surf Life Saving New Zealand

References

External links
 Surf Life Saving Australia
 Surf Life Saving New Zealand
Surf lifesaving